The Deputy Under Secretary / Designated Assistant Secretary of the Treasury for International Finance is a senior position within the United States Department of the Treasury responsible for advising the Secretary of the Treasury on matters of international finance and economic coordination, and overseeing U.S. participation in international financial institutions. The Assistant Secretary is appointed by the President and confirmed by the Senate. The office is currently vacant.

Overview 
The Assistant Secretary is in charge of the Office of International Finance and Development, one of two principal components of the Office of International Affairs within the U.S. Department of the Treasury. He or she oversees seven deputies each with their own Deputy Assistant Secretary, over a dozen offices, and more than 100 personnel. Occupants also hold the rank of Deputy Under Secretary / Designated Assistant Secretary.

Structure 
The Deputy Under Secretary / Designated Assistant Secretary reports to the Under Secretary for International Finance and oversees work by the following senior officials:

 Deputy Assistant Secretary for International Monetary Policy
 Deputy Assistant Secretary for International Debt and Development
 Deputy Assistant Secretary for International Economic Analysis
 Deputy Assistant Secretary for Technical Assistance
 Deputy Assistant Secretary for Africa and the Middle East
 Deputy Assistant Secretary for Asia
 Deputy Assistant Secretary for Europe and Eurasia
 Deputy Assistant Secretary for the Western Hemisphere

Duties 
The Assistant Secretary leads the development and implementation of policies in the areas of international finance, economic development, bilateral and regional economic engagement, and international debt. The Assistant Secretary also oversees G-7 and G-20 coordination, currency policy, and serves as an economic emissary to foreign governments. It also leads the development of policies on U.S. participation in the International Monetary Fund, the World Bank, and the other multilateral development banks (including the Inter-American Development Bank, the African Development Bank, the Asian Development Bank, and the European Bank for Reconstruction and Development).

List of Assistant Secretaries for International Finance, 1977—present

See also
Assistant Secretary of the Treasury

References